Mohammed Ariful Islam (born 20 December 1987) is a Bangladeshi footballer who currently plays as a defender for Brothers Union in the Bangladesh Championship League. He currently plays as a center back, however earlier on his career he was also deployed as a right back. He is a former Bangladesh national football team player, and played for his country from 2006 till 2016.

Club career
Ariful started his career with Young Men's Fakirerpool, he then went on to play for minnows Farashganj SC, before going on to get his big move to Mohammedan SC and then Brothers Union. He injured his right ankle while playing in Mohammedan during the early years of his career. During his time at Sheikh Jamal DC in 2012, Ariful underwent surgery on his right knee and again in 2014, he underwent surgery on his left knee. And although he maintained a strict diet of and daily weight training from the beginning, his career could not go back on track, as he dropped out of the national team in 2013. He also has the experience of winning several league titles for Abahani Limited and Sheikh Jamal, during his stint with the duo. He joined newcomers Saif SC, as they spent big after getting promoted, in 2017. The following four years saw Ariful change clubs three times, before returning to Brothers Union in 2021, after 13 years. Ariful witnessed the lowest point of his career, as the historic Brothers Union, who were once considered the third biggest club in the country, were relegated from the Bangladesh Premier League. This was the clubs first ever taste of relegation since its 72 years existence, in 2021.

International career
Arif was a regular face in the under-20 and 23 national team, before he made his national team debut in the 2007 AFC Asian Cup qualifiers against Qatar, on 6 September 2006. He then went on to play the  2007 Nehru Cup and 2008 SAFF Championship. During the Nehru Cup, coach Syed Nayeemuddin was heavily criticized by the local pundits for deploying Arif as the right-back in a flat-four backline, during all four games. Ariful won the 2010 SA Games, under Serbian coach Zoran Đorđević, which was his only international title in his 11-years playing for Bangladesh. He also played at the 2011 SAFF Championship and 2013 SAFF Championship, during the latter he was vice-captain. Ariful was last called up to the national team, in 2016 for Bangladesh's disastrous 2018 FIFA World Cup qualifiers, by Lodewijk de Kruif. During the qualifiers Bangladesh conceded a total of 13 goals in the two matches Ariful played in, including a 8–0 defeat at the hands of Jordan.

References

External links 
 

1987 births
Living people
People from Kishoreganj District
Bangladeshi footballers
Bangladesh international footballers
Farashganj SC players
Saif SC players
Sheikh Jamal Dhanmondi Club players
Sheikh Russel KC players
Mohammedan SC (Dhaka) players
Brothers Union players
Abahani Limited (Dhaka) players
Association football defenders
Footballers at the 2006 Asian Games
Footballers at the 2010 Asian Games
Asian Games competitors for Bangladesh